Maureen Scott Harris (born 24 April 1943 in Prince Rupert, British Columbia) is a Canadian poet.

Life
Maureen Scott was born in British Columbia. She was raised in Winnipeg, Manitoba, and moved to Toronto in 1964. She graduated from University of Toronto. During her time at university, she worked as a cataloguer at the University of Toronto Library.

Her works appear in The Fiddlehead, The Malahat, Pottersfield Portfolio, Contemporary Verse 2, Room of One's Own, Event, Poetry Canada, Prairie Fire, Grail, and Grain.

She married Peter Harris, a professor at University of Toronto; they have two daughters, Jessica and Katharine.

Awards
2002 Arc's Poem-of-the-Year contest
2009 WildCare Tasmania Nature Writing Prize

Works

Poetry

 (chapbook)
 (reprinted 2006)

Anthologies

Essays
"The Cusp of Change", The National Post, 15 September 2001

References

1943 births
Living people
20th-century Canadian poets
21st-century Canadian poets
Canadian women poets
University of Toronto alumni
People from Prince Rupert, British Columbia
Writers from British Columbia
20th-century Canadian women writers
21st-century Canadian women writers